Mehran Khan (born 13 April 1987) is a Pakistani-born cricketer who plays for the Oman national cricket team. He made his Twenty20 International debut for Oman against Afghanistan in the 2015 ICC World Twenty20 Qualifier tournament on 25 July 2015. He made his List A debut for Oman in their three-match series against the United Arab Emirates in October 2016.

In August 2018, he was named in Oman's squad for the 2018 Asia Cup Qualifier tournament. In October 2018, he was named in Oman's squad for the 2018 ICC World Cricket League Division Three tournament. In September 2019, he was named in Oman's squad for the 2019 ICC T20 World Cup Qualifier tournament. In November 2019, he was named in Oman's squad for the 2019 ACC Emerging Teams Asia Cup in Bangladesh.

References

External links
 

1987 births
Living people
Cricketers from Mardan
Omani cricketers
Oman Twenty20 International cricketers
Pakistani emigrants to Oman
Pakistani expatriates in Oman